The Kid and the Cowboy is a 1919 American short silent Western film directed by B. Reeves Eason.

Cast
 Art Acord as Jud
 Mildred Moore as Flora, Jud's Wife
 B. Reeves Eason, Jr. as Jimsey, Jud's Son (as Breezy Eason)
 Dagmar Godowsky as Dance Hall Girl
 George Field as Larkin (as George Fields)
 Andrew Waldron as The Drunk
 Charles Newton as A Rancher

External links
 

1919 films
1919 short films
1919 Western (genre) films
American silent short films
American black-and-white films
Films directed by B. Reeves Eason
Silent American Western (genre) films
Universal Pictures films
1910s American films
1910s English-language films